Anticasanova is a 1985 Croatian film directed by Vladimir Tadej, starring David Bluestone, Elisa Tebith, Milena Dravić, and Ljubiša Samardžić.

Sources
 Anticasanova at hrfilm.hr

External links
 

1985 films
1980s Croatian-language films
Yugoslav comedy films
Croatian comedy films
Films set in Zagreb